Trozos de Mi Alma (English: Pieces of My Soul) is the third studio album recorded by Mexican singer-songwriter Marco Antonio Solís. It was released by Fonovisa on January 26, 1999 (see 1999 in music). This album became his first number-one set on the Billboard Top Latin Albums, and it was certified platinum by the Recording Industry Association of America for sales over 1,000,000 units in United States; it also received a diamond accreditation in Mexico in 2004.

Trozos de Mi Alma features songs written by Solís, but previously recorded by different artists, including Enrique Iglesias, Olga Tañón, Beatríz Adriana, Dulce, María Sorté and Rocío Dúrcal, among others. His version of the track "Si No Te Hubieras Ido" was included on the soundtrack for the Mexican film Y Tu Mamá También. It was also featured as the opening theme for the Mexican telenovela Salomé, produced by Juan Osorio starring Guy Ecker and Edith González in 2001. "Sigue Sin Mi" was also featured as the opening theme for the Mexican telenovela Siempre te amaré (2000), produced by Juan Osorio starring Laura Flores and Fernando Carrillo.

Track listing

All songs written and composed by Marco Antonio Solís

Chart performance

Sales and certifications

See also
1999 in Latin music
List of number-one Billboard Top Latin Albums of 1999
List of best-selling Latin albums in the United States
 List of best-selling Latin albums

References

1999 albums
Albums produced by Bebu Silvetti
Marco Antonio Solís albums
Spanish-language albums
Fonovisa Records albums
Self-covers albums